The Loop (historically Union Loop) is the  long circuit of elevated rail that forms the hub of the Chicago "L" system in the United States. As of 2012, the branch has served 74,651 passengers every weekday. The Loop is so named because the elevated tracks loop around a rectangle formed by Lake Street (north side), Wabash Avenue (east), Van Buren Street (south), and Wells Street (west). The railway loop has given its name to Chicago's downtown, which is also known as the Loop.

Transit began to appear in Chicago in the latter half of the 19th century as the city grew rapidly, and rapid transit started to be built in the late 1880s. When the first rapid transit lines opened in the 1890s, they were independently owned and each had terminals that were located immediately outside of Chicago's downtown, where it was considered too expensive and politically inexpedient to build rapid transit. Charles Tyson Yerkes aggregated the competing rapid transit lines and built a loop connecting them, which was constructed and opened in piecemeal fashion between 1895 and 1897, finally completing its last connection in 1900. Upon its completion ridership on the Loop was incredibly high, such that the lines that had closed their terminals outside of downtown had to reopen them to accommodate the surplus rush-hour traffic.

In the latter half of the 20th century, ridership declined and the Loop was threatened with demolition in the 1970s. However, interest in historic preservation increased in the 1980s, and ridership has stabilized since.

Operations

The Loop includes eight stations: Clark/Lake and State/Lake are on the northern leg; Washington/Wabash and Adams/Wabash are on the eastern side; Harold Washington Library – State/Van Buren and LaSalle/Van Buren are on the southern leg; and Quincy and Washington/Wells are on the western side. In 2011, 20,896,612 passengers entered the 'L' via these stations.

Two towers control entry to and exit from the Loop.  Tower 12 stands at the southeastern corner. Tower 18 stands watch over the three-quarter union located at the northwestern corner, which at one time was billed as the busiest railroad interlocking in the world.  The current Tower 18 was placed into service on May 19, 2010, replacing the former tower on that site that was built in 1969.

Five of the eight 'L' lines use the Loop tracks:
The Brown Line enters at Tower 18 on the northwest corner, supplemented by the Purple Line at rush hours. The Purple Line "terminates" by making a full circuit clockwise around the Inner Loop, while the Brown Line "terminates" by making a full circuit counterclockwise around the Outer Loop. Following the completion of a full circuit back to Tower 18, trains of these two lines return to their points of origin.
The Orange Line enters at Tower 12 on the southeast corner, and the Pink Line enters at Tower 18 on the northwest corner; both "terminating" by traveling clockwise around the Inner Loop, before returning to their points of origin.
The Green Line is the only line to use Loop trackage but not terminate on it. Its trains run in both directions along the Lake and Wabash sides from Tower 18 to Tower 12, connecting the Lake Street branch and the South Side Elevated.

In the CTA system, the entire loop taken as a whole is considered the termination point of a line, just like a single station or stop is considered the termination point when outside the downtown loop.

Both of the 'L' lines with 24 hour service, the Blue Line and the Red Line, run in subways through the center of the Loop, and have both in-system and out-of-system transfers to Loop stations. The Yellow Line is the only 'L' line that does not run on or connect to the Loop.

History

History of transit in Chicago
When it was incorporated as a city in 1837, Chicago was dense and walkable, so there was no need for a transit system. Things began to change as Chicago grew rapidly in the 19th century.

Rapid transit and the "L"
Prior to construction of the Union Loop, Chicago's three elevated railway lines—the South Side Elevated Railroad, the Lake Street Elevated Railroad, and the Metropolitan West Side Elevated Railroad—each had their own terminal on the edges of downtown Chicago.

Construction of the Loop
The Union Elevated Railroad Company was incorporated November 1894 for the purpose of constructing a loop in the heart of the city's business district. With tense opposition from owners of abutting properties, extensive litigation ensued during the course of receiving approval to build the loop. Between January 8, 1894 and June 29, 1896 a series of ordinances were passed by the Chicago City Council enabling the construction of the Union Loop's route.

The Union Loop was constructed in separate sections: the Lake Street 'L' was extended along the north side in 1895; the Union Elevated Railroad opened the east side along Wabash Avenue in 1896 and the west side along Wells Street in 1897; and the Union Consolidated Elevated Railroad opened the south side along Van Buren Street in 1897.

The Loop opened on September 6, 1897.

The Loop was born in political scandal: upon completion, all the rail lines running downtown had to pay Yerkes's operation a fee, which raised fares for commuters; when Yerkes, after bribery of the state legislature, secured legislation by which he claimed a fifty-year franchise, the resulting furor drove him out of town and ushered in a short-lived era of "Progressive Reform" in Chicago.

Originally there were 12 stations, with three stations on each side. The construction of the west-leg of the Union Loop over Wells Street required the removal of the southern platform of the Fifth/Lake station. The addition of the Northwestern Elevated Railroad caused the removal of the rest of the station as the remaining platform  sat across the new road's entry point. This left 11 stations, two on the north leg of the loop and three on each other leg.

Station listing

This lists each station beginning at the northwest corner and moving counterclockwise around the loop: south along Wells Street, east along Van Buren Street, north along Wabash Avenue, and west along Lake Street.

See also
Chicago Central Area Transit Plan
History of the Loop (CTA)
Wells Street Terminal

References

External links

Loop Elevated at Chicago-L.org

Loop
Historic American Engineering Record in Chicago
Railway loop lines